"(He's) The Great Imposter" is a 1961 song by The Fleetwoods. The song was written by Sharon Sheeley and Jackie DeShannon. It reached #30 on the Billboard Hot 100.  One of the musicians on the song was session drummer Earl Palmer.

Track listing
7" Vinyl
 a. "(He's) The Great Imposter"
 b. "Poor Little Girl"

Chart performance
 US Pop Charts (#30)
 The song remained on the charts for eight weeks.

In popular culture
The song was featured in the 1973 film American Graffiti. 
A version of the song was featured on Lightspeed Champion's 2010 vinyl double-single with "Marlene" as a B-side. The Lightspeed Champion version was featured on the Lifetime TV series You.

References

1961 singles
Songs written by Sharon Sheeley
Songs written by Jackie DeShannon
The Fleetwoods songs
1961 songs